Alice Taglioni (born 26 July 1976) is a French actress.

Personal life 
Alice Taglioni was born in Ermont, Val-d'Oise. She is the daughter of an Italian man from Lombardy. She was Miss Corsica in 1996, but refused to participate in the election of Miss France.

She met French actor Jocelyn Quivrin when they co-starred in Grande École in 2004. Their son, Charlie, was born in March 2009. Six months later, Quivrin died in a car accident.

Filmography

References

External links 

 

1976 births
Living people
People from Ermont
French film actresses
21st-century French actresses
French television actresses
French people of Italian descent